The Winter Star Party, aka WSP, is an annual convention of amateur astronomers where the primary activity is nighttime astronomical observation. This February event is run at Camp Wesumkee located on Scout Key in the Lower Florida Keys. It is hosted by the Southern Cross Astronomical Society of Miami, Florida.

Most attendees camp on site. BBC Sky at Night magazine rated WSP as one of the top 10 star parties in the world. WSP was first established in 1984 by Tippy D'Auria.

See also
 List of astronomical societies

References

External links
Official Website: https://www.scas.org/winter-star-party/

Amateur astronomy organizations
Star parties
Florida culture
Science events in the United States
Annual events in Florida
1984 establishments in Florida